Junyi Li is an engineer with Qualcomm Inc. in Bridgewater, New Jersey. He was named a Fellow of the Institute of Electrical and Electronics Engineers (IEEE) in 2012 for his contributions to modulation techniques for mobile broadband communications systems.

Junyi is a prolific inventor listed on 1,223 U.S. Utility Patents .

References

Fellow Members of the IEEE
Living people
Year of birth missing (living people)
Place of birth missing (living people)
American electrical engineers